This is an alphabetised list of Films produced in Jordan.

References

Jordan
Films